Sripatum Sisaket Futsal Club (Thai สโมสรฟุตซอลศรีปทุม ศรีสะเกษ) is a Thai Futsal club, nicknamed The Bee Slayer and based in Sisaket Province located in the note eastern of Thailand. The club currently plays in the Thailand Futsal League.

Players

Current squad

External links 

Futsal clubs in Thailand
2012 establishments in Thailand
Futsal clubs established in 2012